The roadstead of Brest is a roadstead or bay located in the Finistère department in Brittany in northwestern France. The surface area is about 180 km² (70 sq mi). The port of Brest and one of the two French naval bases, Brest Arsenal, are located on its northern edge. It is linked to the Atlantic Ocean (called the Iroise Sea at this point) by the Goulet de Brest, a strait about 1.8 km wide.  Three main rivers drain into the roadstead: the Penfeld (the town of Brest and the first buildings of the naval base were built on
its banks), the Élorn (or river of Landerneau) and the Aulne (or river of Châteaulin).

Strategic importance
For a number of centuries, Brest has been an important military port.  The easily defensible roadstead of Brest therefore has a number of military installations, for example:
Brest arsenal, on the north of the bay;
the submarine base of the Île Longue, to the south-west;
the École Navale naval college and the Poulmic association of schools at Lanvéoc;
the naval 'graveyard' for ships at Landévennec.

One can also find many remains of old military fortifications and other ruins from past centuries, like the forts at Portzic, at pointe des Espagnols, etc.

Islands within the roadstead of Brest
Plougastel Daoulas
Île Ronde
Logonna Daoulas
Île de la Pointe du Château
Îles du Bindy
Hôpital-Camfrout
Île de Tibidy
Rosnoën
Île d'Arun
Île de Térénez
Crozon
Île Longue
Île du Renard
Île Trébéron
Île des Morts
Île Perdue

Rivers flowing into the roadstead of Brest

Penfeld
Élorn
the river of Daoulas
Aulne
the river of Faou

Environment
Thanks to its layout, the roadstead harbours a wide diversity of natural habitats and a high level of biodiversity.  It also includes many sites of importance for birds, several networks of habitats and underwater corridors and coastal areas of importance.  These areas have been greatly affected by the human activities in the north-west, but have justified the classification of around half of the roadstead as a zone in Natura 2000.

Pollution
The rich ecology of the roadstead has been diminished by the past exploitation of certain resources, and by the presence of a number of pollutants including heavy metals and tributyltin which were used as biocides in anti-fouling bottom paints.  These products are now illegal, but they remain present in sediments and certain organisms.  The products which have replaced them for small boats (e.g. Diuron and Irgarol) pose similar problems and have been measured in non-negligible quantities in the roadstead by Ifremer in 2003-2004.

The roadstead is also a victim of the after-effects of war, and in particular the waves of pollution from the First and the Second World Wars. Pollutants trapped in submerged or unexploded munitions are expected to aggravate existing pollution with the first large leaks predicted by experts to occur in the years 2000-2010.

Notes and references

External links

 Aerial view

Geography of Brest, France
History of Brest, France
Brest, roadstead